Celtic Star may refer to a number of ships.

 a ro/ro ferry entering service in 2008 with Seatruck Ferries.
, a cargo ship torpedoed and sunk in 1943.
, a refrigerated cargo ship which served with Blue Star Line in 1946.

Ship names